The 2020 Canadian Premier League season was the second season of the Canadian Premier League (CPL), the top level of Canadian soccer.

In response to the COVID-19 pandemic, the CPL announced a 14-day hold on all pre-season training on March 13, 2020. On March 20, the league announced that it would be postponing the start of the season from the previously scheduled date of April 11.

A shortened 2020 season tournament, branded as The Island Games, was played at the University of Prince Edward Island from August 13 to September 19. All players were required to self-isolate for 14 days before travelling, self-isolate for five more days upon arrival, and receive two negative COVID-19 tests before being allowed to play. As of July 29, PEI had the lowest number of COVID-19 cases among provinces, at 36.

Initially, all matches were held behind closed doors. On August 8, the league announced a partnership with the province and PEI Soccer to allow 50 minor soccer players per game to attend matches.

Atlético Ottawa joined the league as its first expansion team, bringing the total number of teams to eight. Hamilton's Forge FC defended their inaugural CPL title, blanking HFX Wanderers FC 2–0 in the final.

Overview

Teams 

The seven teams that participated in the inaugural 2019 Canadian Premier League season were set to compete in this season. They were joined by Atlético Ottawa, an expansion team who were created after USL Championship side Ottawa Fury FC suspended operations after being unable to secure approval from USSF and CONCACAF.

Personnel and sponsorship

Coaching changes

Original format
Before being postponed by the COVID-19 pandemic, the regular season was intended to be played from April 11 to October 4. The split-season format of the inaugural season was to be replaced by a single table and full double round-robin. The eight teams would have met their rivals twice at home and twice away for a total of 28 games, the same number as in 2019. The top ranked team in the regular season would have qualified for a spot in the championship final and would have been joined by the winner of a playoff between the second and third ranked teams.

First stage
The eight teams played against each other once each for a total of seven matches. The top four teams advanced to the group stage.

Table

Results

Results by round

Group stage 
The four group stage teams met their opponents once each. The top two teams advanced to the final.

Table

Results

Results by round

Final

Statistical leaders

Top scorers

Top assists 

|}

Shutouts

Player transfers

U Sports Draft 

The 2019 CPL–U Sports Draft was held on November 11 in Montreal, Quebec. Draftees were invited to team preseason camps, with an opportunity to earn a developmental contract and retain their U Sports men's soccer eligibility. HFX Wanderers selected Cory Bent with the first overall pick. Two players were selected by each returning CPL team, with a total of 14 players being drafted including 10 Canadians. Ottawa had not yet joined the league and did not participate in the draft.

Foreign players 
Canadian Premier League teams may sign a maximum of seven international players, out of which only five can be in the starting line-up for each match. The following players are considered foreign players for the 2020 season. This list does not include Canadian citizens who represent other countries at the international level.

Players in italic denote players new to their respective clubs for the 2020 season, sorted chronologically by their announcement.

Awards

Canadian Premier League Awards
The nominees for the four CPL awards were announced on September 18, one day before the league final. The awards take into account all matches from The Island Games and are voted on by reporters across Canada. The winners were announced at a ceremony on November 26, 2020.

Team of the Week
The Gatorade Team of the Week is selected by OneSoccer staff.

Media 
OneSoccer broadcast all matches of the tournament. CBC Television televised nine matches on Saturdays, and CHCH-TV in Hamilton broadcast Sunday matches. To visually enhance the venue for broadcast as it is only a pitch, an augmented reality "virtual stadium" was employed by host broadcaster Mediapro, rendering CGI grandstands with virtual sponsor placements. An AI-based automated camera system was used for 19 matches, using similar technology to what was used for the CEBL Summer Series.

See also
2020 Canadian Championship

References

 
Canadian Premier League seasons
Canadian Premier League
Canadian Premier League
Soccer in Prince Edward Island